Reluciente, Rechinante y Aterciopelado is the first live album by Colombian band Aterciopelados. It was recorded before a live audience of 140 guests in Bogotá, Colombia, on June 2, 2015 and released as a CD and DVD on April 22, 2016. Directed by Roberto de Zubiría and produced by Rafael Arcaurte the album includes featured performances by León Larregui, Spanish singer Macaco, Goyo (ChocQuibTown) and Catalina García (Monsieur Perine).

The proposal to record a concert film came from Sony Music Colombia after the band's comeback concert at Rock al Parque 2014. After almost two months of rehearsals the concert was recorded. The album contains songs from their previous albums El Dorado, La Pipa de la Paz, Caribe Atómico and Gozo Poderoso as well as songs from solo projects by the members of the band. As of July 2017, the DVD has been certified Gold in Colombia, denoting 5,000 copies sold.

Recording and scenery
The musical pre-production was carried out in Tigo Music Studios by Audiovisión, the studio where the band recorded some of their most well-known works. The concert took place in RTI studios, which was illuminated with lamps made out of 810 bottles of detergent and softeners, a large velvet heart, a tree made of tires and plastic caps, and CDs that served as a framework on the steps. Juan Garces was in charge of the scenery.

The recording consisted of two sessions totaling approximately three hours. The first, beginning with Baracunatana, included El Estuche, El Álbum and Rompecabezas. They then go ahead into a couple solo songs, Soy La Semilla Nativa from Niños Cristal by Buitrago and Yo, one of the most glittering hits from the album Dos by Echeverri. The second session contains an unreleased track called Re which is a tribute to the Mexican band Café Tacuba. It consists of sets of words with the "Re" syllable and a Norteño melody. For the interpretation of Maligno, León Larregui of the band Zoé and Colombian bandoneon player Giovanni Parra were invited to perform with them. Bolero Falaz, Luz Azul with Spanish singer Macaco and Florecita Rockera with Goyo of ChocQuibTown and Catalina Garcia of Monsieur Perine closed off this block. At the end, La Estaca was performed as a gift to the public, however it is not included in any format of the release.

Track listing

Personnel
Musicians
 Andrea Echeverri: vocals, rhythm guitar
 Héctor Buitrago: bass, backing vocals
 Gregorio Merchán: drums
 Leonardo Castiblanco: guitar
 Natalia Pazos: percussion and chorus
 Catalina Ávila: percussion and chorus

Additional musicians
 Marco Antonio Farinango: winds
 Giovanni Parra: bandoneon 
 León Larregui: vocals and chorus
 Macaco: vocals and chorus
 Goyo: vocals and chorus
 Catalina García: vocals and chorus

Recording personnel
 Rafael Arcaute: producer
 Rafa Sardina: mixing
 Paula Pérez: wardrobe
 Roberto de Zubiría: film director
 Roberto León: film technical team
 Mauricio Pardo: film technical team

Artwork
 Art Direction: Beatriz Leal and Juan Garcés
 Design and diagrams: Andrea Hermida and La Post
 Illustration: Andrea Hermida, Andrea Echeverri, Juan Andrés Moreno, Santiago Uribe, La Post
 Photography: Juan Andrés Moreno, Giancarlo Barco

References

External links

2016 compilation albums
Aterciopelados albums